AFAA may be the abbreviation for
 Adult Film Association of America
 Athletics and Fitness Association of America
 Association for Families who have Adopted from Abroad (UK Registered Charity)
 Americans for African Adoptions